ADR Uniao or Associação Desportiva e Recréativa Uniao de Timor is an East Timorese football club based in Dili. This club play at Liga Futebol Amadora.

Honours
Campeonato Nacional da 3ª Divisão champions: 1964–65

Competition records

Liga Futebol Amadora 
2016: 6th place in Groub A Segunda Divisao

Taça 12 de Novembro
2016: 1st Round

Former coaches
Di Paola (1961–1970)

References

Football clubs in East Timor
Football
Sport in Dili